Dr Alwyn Robbins (1920 – 10 January 2002) was a distinguished British geodesist, being Chairman of the Royal Society's Geodesy Subcommittee, and was a Founding Fellow of St Cross College in Oxford.

Robbins' scientific publications covered a wide field in Geodesy and Photogrammetry, with outstanding contributions to knowledge in Geodetic astronomy and the design and development of the Chronochord (printing crystal clock). His scientific achievements were recognised by the International Association of Geodesy which elected him Secretary of Section (Control Surveys) of the Association, and President of the Special Study Group on Geodetic Astronomy.

He was a United Kingdom delegate to many international scientific assemblies and symposia. As Chairman of the Geodesy Subcommittee of the National Committee for Geodesy and Geophysics, he was appointed Chief United Kingdom Delegate to the XVI General Assembly of the International Association of Geodesy in Grenoble in 1975 and in Canberra in 1979.

Early life
Alwyn Robbins was born in Lydney in Gloucestershire and educated at Blundell's School in Tiverton and Hertford College in Oxford where he read mathematics (and where he won an open mathematical scholarship and two exhibitions).

In 1940 Robbins obtained a commission in the Survey Branch of the Royal Engineers and was posted to West Africa. Demobilised in 1946, he returned to Oxford to complete his degree, which he was awarded with first class honours.

Career
In 1947 Robbins was appointed Demonstrator in the then Department of Surveying at Oxford and, after successive promotions, he became, in 1966, Reader and Head of the Department of Surveying and Geodesy.
His obituary records:

Robbins wrote a number of important papers and held several appointments in committees of the International Association of Geodesy. He was chairman of the Geodesy Sub-committee of the Royal Society. He had extensive international links and spent sabbatical periods in the United States, Canada and New Zealand, as well as a two-year secondment with the Ministry of Defence.

Sources 
Obituary of Alwyn Robbins, St Cross College, Oxford, Extracted 20 November 2009
Obituary of Alwyn Robbins, Newsletter of the International Association of Geodesy, University of Copenhagen

1920 births
2002 deaths
People educated at Blundell's School
Alumni of Hertford College, Oxford
British geodesists
Royal Engineers officers
British Army personnel of World War II